Phases of play are parts of a chess problem which happen, as it were, concurrently rather than consecutively.

Each problem has at least one phase: the post-key play or actual play; that is, the play after the key (the first move which leads to the problem's stipulation ("mate in two" or similar) being fulfilled). Other phases, which may or may not be present, are:

set play: play which would occur if it were the other side to move first in the diagram position (for instance, in a directmate, where it is usually White to move first, set play consists of lines where Black moves first)
try play: play after tries; that is, moves which almost meet the stipulation, but which fail, normally to a single Black defence
solutions to twins: slight variations to the problem brought about by, for example, changing the position of a piece, or switching the position of two pieces
extra solutions: some problems intentionally have more than one solution; in this case, each is a distinct phase

A problem with n phases is called an n-phase problem. So a problem with set play and three tries, for example, is a five-phase problem (since the actual solution is also a phase).

Each phase may contain a number of variations (lines arising from alternatives after the initial move of a phase; in a two-mover, for example, variations in the post-key play begin on Black's first move), but variations do not constitute distinct phases in themselves.

In many problems, interest is created from the way in which the play in different phases relate to one another. Sometimes the play in different phases has similar or contrasting motivation; sometimes the actual moves in different phases may change or transfer from one phase to another. Several basic ideas involving the relationship between different phases have been revisited again and again by composers and have acquired names; for example, in the Zagoruiko, at least two black defences are answered by different white continuations in at least three phases; in the Le Grand, in one phase move A is threatened and defence x is met by move B, while in another phase move B is threatened and defence x is met by move A; in the Lacny the black defences a, b and c are met by the white moves A, B and C respectively in one phase and by B, C and A respectively in another.

See also
 chess problem terminology

Chess problems